

John Dabney (1752–1819) was a postmaster, publisher, and bookseller in Salem, Massachusetts, in the late 18th and early 19th centuries. He was born in Boston in 1752 to Charles Dabney and Elizabeth Gardner. With Thomas C. Cushing, John Dabney published the Salem Mercury newspaper, 1787-1789. In 1790 he married Abigail Mason Peale (1767-1834). Beginning around 1790 he ran the "Salem Book-Store" which offered books for sale or short-term rental; customers included William Bentley. Dabney also served as Salem postmaster ca.1792-1815. He belonged to the North Church in Salem and the Essex Lodge of the Freemasons. Dabney sold the contents of his shop at auction in 1818. He died in 1819.

Selected titles in Dabney's bookstore & library
In 1813, Dabney's stock included:

 Aikin's Annual Review and History of Literature
 Bygge's Travels in the French Republic
 Mrs. Chapone's Works
 M.C. Dallas' Morelando
 Charles Didbin's Song Smith; or, Rigmarole Repository
 Sarah Fielding's Cry, a new dramatick fable
 William Godwin's Fleetwood
 T. Harral's Scenes from Life
 Henry Home's Art of Thinking
 William Jay's Sermons
 Lives of Illustrious Seamen
 Richard Parkinson's Tour in America
 Susanna Rowson's Charlotte Temple
 Anna Seward's Life of Dr. Darwin
 Tabitha Tenney's Female Quixotism, or History of Dorcasina Sheldon
 Maria Tharmott's Sans Souci Park
 Mrs. Thicknesse's School for Fashion
 Richard Twiss's Miscellanies
 Walter Scott's Ballads and Lyrical Pieces

See also
 Books in the United States

References

Further reading

Issued by Dabney
 
 
 

Catalogs
 
 
 
 

History of Salem, Massachusetts
Libraries in Essex County, Massachusetts
Commercial circulating libraries
Bookstores in Massachusetts
People from Salem, Massachusetts
American booksellers
Postal officials
1752 births
1819 deaths